Stosch Island (Spanish: Isla Stosch) is an island located between the Angamos Island (east) and the Covadonga (northwest) and Carlos Islands (west). The Ladrillero Channel runs at the East side. The Golfo Ladrillero is at the South shore of Stosch Island. At the West shore is the Pacific ocean.

The island is named after German Admiral Albrecht von Stosch.

See also
 List of islands of Chile

External links
 Islands of Chile @ United Nations Environment Programme
 World island information @ WorldIslandInfo.com
 South America Island High Points above 1000 meters
 United States Hydrographic Office, South America Pilot (1916)

Islands of Magallanes Region